Halle is a city and municipality of Belgium, in the district (arrondissement) Halle-Vilvoorde of the province Flemish Brabant. It is located on the Brussels-Charleroi Canal and on the Flemish side of the language border that separates Flanders and Wallonia. Halle lies on the border between the Flemish plains to the North (thick loam) and the undulating Brabant lands to the South (thinner loam). The city also borders on the Pajottenland to the west. The official language of Halle is Dutch.

The municipality Halle comprises the city of Halle proper and the towns of Buizingen and Lembeek. The neighboring towns are: Pepingen, Sint-Pieters-Leeuw, Beersel, Braine-l'Alleud, Braine-le-Château, and Tubize. The population of Halle has increased from 32,758 inhabitants in 1991 to 39,536 on 1 January 2019. The mayor is Marc Snoeck of the Vooruit party.

History

Antiquity and Middle Ages 
Borders have always played an important role in the history of Halle.  Already in the prehistoric era, before the Roman conquests, a tribe of Nervii – either a Germanized Celtic people or a Celticized Germanic people – lived in this region.  In the 7th century, Saint Waltrude, the daughter of an important Merovingian personality, gave some of her inherited land around Halle to the chapter of the abbey which she had just founded in Mons.  From that time on and until the French Revolution, the region around Halle would depend to various degrees on the County of Hainaut.  In the 8th century, Hubertus, archbishop of Tongeren, founded a church dedicated to the Blessed Virgin Mary, which may have been the start of the devotion that still continues today.

The town must have grown quickly since Jeanne, Countess of Flanders and Hainaut, already granted it its freedom charters in 1225.  The miraculous statue of the Virgin arrived in Halle in 1267 as a wedding gift to John II, Count of Holland and of Hainaut.  The cult of Mary attracted important visitors such as Edward I of England and Ludwig the Bavarian, making Halle an important frontier town between Hainaut and Brabant. A much bigger church was now needed, that was completed in the 15th century.  The death of Philip the Bold, Duke of Burgundy in Halle in 1404 was actually a benefit to the city as all subsequent ruling Dukes of Burgundy were to pay a visit here.  Even Louis XI of France decided to bury his stillborn son in the Halle church in 1460.

Renaissance and modern era 
After the death of Mary of Burgundy, Flanders and Brabant revolted against her husband Maximilian, while Hainaut, and therefore Halle, remained loyal to the emperor.  Two attempts by a Brussels army to conquer Halle in 1489 failed.  In the 16th century, Brussels and Halle were fighting again, this time over religion, as Calvinistic Brabant tried to overtake Catholic Hainaut.  Again, two attempts failed, leading to an increased devotion to the city's miraculous statue.  In 1621, with the support of the archdukes Albert and Isabella, the Jesuits brought educational institutions and their religious influence to the city.

Halle and the surrounding area were used by Philip IV of Spain as a warrant against a loan, leading to the cessation of the city to the Duke of Arenberg in 1648. Louis XIV's wars at the end of the century resulted in heavy losses, but the 18th century saw a resurgence in devotional and economic prosperity.  The French Revolution brought the usual religious curtailments to religious life; however, the pilgrimage site and the statue were spared confiscation thanks to the initiative of the inhabitants.  The religious services were completely restored under Napoleon, and the tradition of princely visits to the church of Halle continues until this day.

Today, Halle is a regional services and care center, offering trade, educational establishments, general hospital, and public services (61% of the active population works in the services sector).

The February 2010 train collision in Buizingen killed around 18 people.

Flag and arms 
The flag of Halle was adopted on 1 October 1991 and is quartered as saltire (argent and azure). Its proportions are 2:3.  If you cut the flag in two vertically and flip both sides, you get a blue lozenge, hinting at Bavaria.

On the municipal coat of arms, the first quarter shows an argent-coloured virgin with child on an azure background.  The fourth quarter is the coat of arms of the Wittelsbach family. The second and third quarters are the coat of arms of Hainaut, accentuating Halle's position right on the language border.

Notable buildings 

 The Sint-Martinusbasiliek (Basilica of Saint Martin), also known as the Gothic Church of Our Lady, is a basilica in High Gothic style that was a popular pilgrimage site since the 14th–15th century. The church contains a celebrated miraculous image of the Holy Virgin, that of a Black Madonna.
 The former city hall on the main market square (Grote Markt) dates from the Renaissance (City Hall:
 The former college of the Jesuits currently houses a music and dance academy and, formerly, the South-West Brabant Museum that is housed in Den Ast since 2014.

Events 
 Every year, in the middle of Lent, Carnival is celebrated during three days. This is a colourful event, where various groups make floats and costumes or perform dances. The Halle carnival has been organized since 1905 and has grown to be one of the biggest carnivals in Belgium.
 On Easter Monday, the Sint-Veroonprocessie takes place.  This is a religious procession where the relics of the saint are being carried around the village of Lembeek.
 Halle is also the site of a popular pilgrimage to the Blessed Virgin Mary.  The present format of this devotion is at least seven centuries old.
 The Hallerbos, the nearby forest named after the town, is known for the prolific bluebell carpet which covers the forest floor for a few weeks each spring, attracting many visitors.
 On 15 February 2010, 18 people died when two trains collided in Buizingen, near Halle's railway station.

Notable people 

 Jozef Cardijn (1882–1967), founder of the Young Christian Workers and cardinal
 Justus Lipsius (1547–1606) wrote his first historical work about Halle.
 Philip II, Duke of Burgundy (1342–1404) died in Halle.
 Adrien-François Servais (1807–1866), composer and cellist. He has a statue on Halle's main square.

Notable products 
 Duivelsbier, a local beer, is now brewed by the Boon Brewery.
 The famous Lambic beer is conjectured to take its name from the village of Lembeek, now part of Halle.
 Halle used to have its own newspaper, named the future of Halle. (l'Avenir de Hal)

International relations

Twin towns – Sister cities 
Halle is twinned with:

See also 
 Brussels-Halle-Vilvoorde electoral district
 The Blue Forest of Halle, Belgium
Church of Our Lady of Hal, Camden Town, London, England

References 

 Clement, Raymond & Decreton, Jan: "Halle: een Bourgondisch feest", Lannoo, Tielt, 1991, 144 pp., .

External links 

 Official website Only available in Dutch

Municipalities of Flemish Brabant